Hibiscus sinosyriacus, the Chinese rose of Sharon, is a species of flowering plant in the family Malvaceae, native to southern China. The Royal Horticultural Society considers it a good plant for chalky soils. A number of cultivars are available, including 'Lilac Queen' and 'Ruby Glow'.

References

sinosyriacus
Garden plants of Asia
Endemic flora of China
Flora of South-Central China
Flora of Southeast China
Plants described in 1922